Wisconsin Area Music Industry (WAMI) is an American volunteer organization founded in 1980, and based in Milwaukee, Wisconsin. Its stated purpose is "to educate and recognize the achievements and accomplishments of individuals in the Wisconsin music industry." The organization is best known for its annual awards for Wisconsin musicians from various genres of music. It also hosts seminars and workshops on subjects related to music and the music industry, such as performing, recording and marketing.

Partnerships and Objectives 
The WAMI works with several organizations within the local music industry. These groups include:
Guitar 4 Vets

Awards
WAMI began presenting awards in 1980. It held its award ceremony in Milwaukee until switching to Appleton.

Notable artists who have won the WAMI Artist of the Year award include The Gufs (1998) and Bon Iver (2009).

Members of WAMI's hall of fame include the diverse artists Butch Vig, Al Jarreau, Bob Kames, Liberace, Les Paul, Violent Femmes, and BoDeans.

Other notable artists to receive awards include alternative rock group Garbage, rockers Fever Marlene and Verona Grove, hip hop/rap group Rusty Ps, power pop rock band Yipes! and polka artists Verne Meisner and Louis Bashell. Nominees have included 2009 American Idol contestant Danny Gokey who didn't win that year but won the Male Vocalist the following year.

Current Board Members 
Exec Board
 Jason Klagstad - President
 Ron Books - Vice President
 Jessie Greenwald - Secretary
 Dave Dayler - Treasurer
 Mike Mann - Operations
	
 Brian J Harrison - Member
 Pat Nettesheim - Member
 Ann Rakiowiecki - Member
 Joey Carini - Member
 Phil Norby - Member
 Danny Faustmann - Member
 Drew Ahlborg - Member
 Jimmy Schwarz - Member
 Steve Brill - Member

References
Official website:https://wami.org/

1980 establishments in Wisconsin
Organizations based in Milwaukee
Organizations established in 1980